The Y Covered Bridge No. 156 was a historic wooden covered bridge located in Sugarloaf Township in Columbia County, Pennsylvania. It crossed East Branch Fishing Creek. It was one of 28 historic covered bridges in Columbia and Montour Counties.

It was listed on the National Register of Historic Places in 1979, and destroyed in a suspicious fire on August 15, 1983.

References 

Covered bridges on the National Register of Historic Places in Pennsylvania
Covered bridges in Columbia County, Pennsylvania
Bridges completed in 1887
Wooden bridges in Pennsylvania
Bridges in Columbia County, Pennsylvania
National Register of Historic Places in Columbia County, Pennsylvania
Road bridges on the National Register of Historic Places in Pennsylvania
Queen post truss bridges in the United States
1887 establishments in Pennsylvania